Richard Burpee Hanson,  (March 20, 1879 – July 14, 1948) was a Canadian politician who served as interim leader of the Conservative Party from May 14, 1940, until November 11, 1941.

Early life and education
Hanson was born on March 20, 1879, in Bocabec, Charlotte County, New Brunswick, to parents Richard B. and Hannah Hanson. He was educated in public schools in St. Andrews, New Brunswick, Mount Allison University, and Dalhousie Law School.

Career
Hanson was admitted to the Bar of New Brunswick in November 1902 and was created a King's Counsel by the Government of New Brunswick in January 1917. From 1918 to 1920, he was Mayor of Fredericton.

First elected as a Conservative Member of Parliament (MP) for the New Brunswick electoral district of York—Sunbury in the 1921 general election, Hanson served continuously in the House of Commons of Canada until his defeat in the 1935 election. He was appointed to the Cabinet of R. B. Bennett in 1934 as Minister of Trade and Commerce.

In the 1940 election, he returned to Parliament despite the poor showing of the Conservatives in that election and the personal defeat of Robert Manion. Since Manion resigned two months after the election, the Conservative caucus chose Hanson as interim leader and he served as Conservative Party Leader until Arthur Meighen was appointed the party's new leader in November 1941. As Meighen did not have a seat in the House (and then failed to win a seat through a by-election), Hanson continued as Leader of the Opposition until 1943.

Death and legacy
Hanson died on July 14, 1948, due to illness. The University of New Brunswick hands out the Richard Burpee Hanson Prize to a Faculty of Arts male student with the highest grades in English and History in the Sophomore level.

Archives 
There is a Richard Burpee Hanson fonds at Library and Archives Canada.

Electoral history

References

Bibliography

 
 

1879 births
1948 deaths
Leaders of the Conservative Party of Canada (1867–1942)
Mayors of Fredericton
Members of the House of Commons of Canada from New Brunswick
Members of the King's Privy Council for Canada
Leaders of the Opposition (Canada)
Canadian King's Counsel